Nina Vladislavovna Kirso; 4 August 1963  – 30 April 2020) was a Soviet and Ukrainian singer in the disco genre. She was the lead singer of the pop group Freestyle from 1988 to 2018.

Career 
In 2014, the Freestyle group celebrated its 25th anniversary. By tradition, the artists met a new creative year on stage. Friends of the team also joined the festive show, including Mikhail Gritskan, with whom Nina Kirso sang the composition "Old House".

Death 
In 2018, she suffered a large stroke at her home. In 2020, she died at the age of 56.

References

External links
 Официальный сайт группы «Фристайл»
 Неофициальный виртуальный музей группы «Фристайл»

1963 births
2020 deaths
Musicians from Poltava
20th-century Ukrainian women singers
21st-century Ukrainian women singers
Disco musicians
Ukrainian pop singers